Leatherstocking Falls also known as "Panthers Leap", "Bear Cliff Falls" and "Deowongo Falls", is located on Leatherstocking Creek north of Cooperstown, New York. Deowongo translates to "place of hearing", coming from the Oneida Iroquois nation’s language. These falls are where, in James Fenimore Cooper's Leatherstocking Tales, Leatherstocking saves the life of an Indian maiden.

References

Waterfalls of New York (state)
Landforms of Otsego County, New York
Tourist attractions in Otsego County, New York